Fortescue is an 1846 three-volume novel by the Irish writer James Sheridan Knowles. He had for many years been a leading West End playwright, but by this stage his career was in gradual decline and he turned to novel-writing. It is set in Cork where Knowles was born and raised. The The New Monthly Magazine review believed that the novel may have been semi-autobiographical. It was serialised in The Sunday Times. It was published in New York by Harper Brothers in 1847.

References

Bibliography
  Burwick, Frederick Goslee, Nancy Moore & Hoeveler Diane Long . The Encyclopedia of Romantic Literature. John Wiley & Sons,  2012.
 Law, Graham. Serializing Fiction in the Victorian Press. Springer, 2000.
 Murphy, James H. Irish Novelists and the Victorian Age. Oxford University Press, 2011.

1846 British novels
19th-century Irish novels
Novels set in County Cork
Harper & Brothers books
Works by James Sheridan Knowles